The Cheyenne Stampede were a United Hockey Union-sanctioned junior ice hockey team in the Western States Hockey League (WSHL). The Stampede played their home games at the Cheyenne Ice and Events Center. The team announced it would not participate in the 2019–20 season due to a lease dispute.

History 
Prior to the 2011–12 season the team was the Tulsa Rampage, a USA Hockey-sanctioned Tier III Junior A ice hockey team, based in Tulsa, Oklahoma. The team played in the Midwest Division of the WSHL at the Oilers Ice Center.

In 2011, Julie Wilson, the owner at the time, sold the Rampage to Mark Lantz of Cheyenne, Wyoming.

During their eighth season in Cheyenne on February 24, 2019, Lantz announced the team was for sale or seeking additional investors. He claimed the city's new administration in 2018 made new lease for the arena with a 52% increase in the arena fees while simultaneously stipulating the team could no longer use advertisements around the ice rinks. The new administration, led by mayor Marian Orr, made the changes due to the city not want to charge the taxpayers to subsidize the ice rink as was being done with the previous contracts. On May 4, the team did not reach an agreement on a lease extension with the city and announced it would cease operations for at least the 2019–20 season with the franchise license returning to the league.

Season-by-season records

Coaches 
 Jeff Heimel (2011–2013)
 Eric Ballard (2014–2015)
Gary Gill (2013–2014, 2015–2017)
Joe Pfleegor (March – September 2017)
Joe Liquori (September – November 15, 2017)
Neil Breen (November 16, 2017 – 2019)

References

External links
 Cheyenne Stampede website
 WSHL website

Ice hockey teams in Wyoming
Ice hockey clubs established in 2004
2004 establishments in Wyoming